Saroj Babulal Ahire is a leader of the Nationalist Congress Party who is serving as member of Maharashtra Legislative Assembly from Deolali Assembly constituency in Nashik city.

References

Members of the Maharashtra Legislative Assembly
Nationalist Congress Party politicians from Maharashtra
People from Nashik
Year of birth missing (living people)
Living people